Mohd Khairul Anuar bin Ramli (born 31 March 1983) is a Malaysian professional football player currently playing for PKNS FC in the Malaysian Premier League as a defender. He was formerly with Perlis FA before released to PKNS FC.

See also
Football in Malaysia
List of football clubs in Malaysia

References

1983 births
Living people
Malaysian footballers
Perlis FA players
People from Kelantan
Association football defenders